The 2010 Copa Sudamericana de Clubes (officially the 2010 Copa Nissan Sudamericana de Clubes for sponsorship reasons) was the 9th edition of CONMEBOL's secondary international club tournament. The winner qualified for the 2011 Copa Libertadores, the 2011 Recopa Sudamericana, and the 2011 Suruga Bank Championship. LDU Quito was the defending champion.

Starting with this edition, each country gained an additional berth, with the exception of Argentina and Brazil. Boca Juniors and River Plate were no longer invited to the competition without merit.

Qualified teams

Round and draw dates 
The calendar shows the dates of the rounds and draw. All events occurred in 2010 unless otherwise stated. Dates in italics are only reference dates for the week the matches are to be played. The draw for this tournament took place on April 28 in Luque at the CONMEBOL Conventions Center.

Tie-breaking criteria 
The tournament is played as a single-elimination tournament, with each round played as two-legged ties.
At each stage of the tournament teams receive 3 points for a win, 1 point for a draw, and no points for a loss. If two or more teams are equal on points, the following criteria will be applied to determine which team advances to the next round:

 better goal difference;
 higher number of away goals scored;
 penalty shootout.

Preliminary stages 

The first two stages of the competition are the First Stage and Second Stage. Both stages are largely played concurrent to each other.

First stage 

In the First Stage, 16 teams played two-legged ties (one game at home and one game away) against another opponent. The winner of each tie advanced to the Second Stage. Team #1 played the second leg at home. The stage began on August 3 and ended on September 2.

|-

|}

Second stage 
In the Second Stage, 22 teams, along with eight winners from the First Stage, played two-legged ties (one game at home and one game away) against one another. The winner of each tie advanced to the round of 16. Team #1 played the second leg at home. The stage began on August 4 and ended on September 23.

|-

|}

Final stages 

Teams from the Round of 16 onwards will be seeded depending on which Second Stage tie they win (i.e. the winner of Match O1 will have the 1 seed).

Bracket 

Note: The bracket was adjusted according to the rules of the tournament so that the two Brazilian teams would face each other in the semifinals.

Round of 16 
The round of 16 began on September 28 and ended on October 21. Fifteen teams advanced to the Round of 16 from the Second Stage. LDU Quito, as the defending champion, entered directly into this stage and carries seed O8. In each tie, the team with the higher seed (Team #1) played at home in the second leg.

|-

|}

Quarterfinals 
The quarterfinals began on October 27 and ended on November 11. In each tie, the team with the higher seed (Team #1) played at home in the second leg.

|-

|}

Semifinals 
The semifinals began on November 17 and ended on November 25. Should two or more teams from a same country reach the semifinals, they were going to be forced to face each other. In each tie, the team with the higher seed (Team #1) played at home in the second leg.

|-

|}

Finals 

In the finals, if the finalists are tied on points after the culmination of the second leg, the winner is the team who scored the most goals. If they are tied on goals, the game moves onto extra time and a penalty shootout if necessary. The away goals rule does not apply in the finals. The team with the higher seed played at home in the second leg.

Top goalscorers

See also 
 2010 Copa Libertadores
 2011 Recopa Sudamericana
 2011 Suruga Bank Championship

References

External links 
 Copa Nissan Sudamericana 2010 

 
2
Copa Sudamericana seasons